Biscayne Beach is a residential high-rise in the Edgewater neighborhood of Miami, Florida, U.S.A. The building rises to  with 52 floors. In 2021 a combined Penthouse unit totaling over 20000 ft² was sold, considered the largest condo sale by square footage in the county.

See also
 List of tallest buildings in Miami

References

Residential skyscrapers in Miami
2017 establishments in Florida
Residential buildings completed in 2017
Residential condominiums in Miami